The Louw Wepener Medal, post-nominal letters LWM, is a South African military decoration for bravery which was instituted by the Republic of South Africa on 20 October 1967. It was awarded to members of the South African Defence Force for courageous or heroic deeds in saving lives. The Louw Wepener Medal was discontinued on 1 July 1975, when a new set of decorations and medals was instituted.

The South African military
The Union Defence Forces (UDF) were established in 1912 and renamed the South African Defence Force (SADF) in 1958. On 27 April 1994, it was integrated with six other independent forces into the South African National Defence Force (SANDF).

Institution
The Louw Wepener Medal, post-nominal letters LWM, was instituted by the State President on 20 October 1967, as a second-level military decoration for bravery in addition to the existing Louw Wepener Decoration. The awards were named in honour of Louw Wepener who, in 1865, lost his life whilst leading his burghers in an attack on a Basotho stronghold on Thaba Bosigo, during the Basuto Wars of 1858 to 1865.

Award criteria
The Medal could be awarded to all ranks of the South African Defence Force, or serving with or rendering service to the Defence Force, for courageous or heroic deeds of self-sacrifice in saving lives in the presence of personal danger, or deeds performed in the execution of or beyond the call of military duty and for which other purely military awards were not normally made. A Bar could be awarded for a further similar deed of bravery.

Only eight awards were made, the first in 1969 and the last in 1975. No bar to the decoration was ever awarded.

Order of wear

The position of the Louw Wepener Medal in the official order of precedence was revised twice after 1975, to accommodate the inclusion or institution of new decorations and medals, first upon the integration into the South African National Defence Force in 1994 and again upon the institution of a new set of awards in 2003.

South African Defence Force until 26 April 1994
  
Official SADF order of precedence:
 Preceded by the Van Riebeeck Medal (VRM).
 Succeeded by the Pro Virtute Medal (PVM).
Official national order of precedence:
 Preceded by the Van Riebeeck Medal (VRM).
 Succeeded by the Pro Virtute Medal (PVM).

South African National Defence Force from 27 April 1994
  
Official SANDF order of precedence:
 Preceded by the Van Riebeeck Medal (VRM) of the Republic of South Africa.
 Succeeded by the Distinguished Gallantry Medal of the Republic of Bophuthatswana.
Official national order of precedence:
 Preceded by the Van Riebeeck Medal (VRM) of the Republic of South Africa.
 Succeeded by the Distinguished Gallantry Medal of the Republic of Bophuthatswana.

The position of the Louw Wepener Medal in the order of precedence remained unchanged, as it was on 27 April 1994, when decorations and medals were belatedly instituted in April 1996 for the two former non-statutory forces, the Azanian People's Liberation Army and Umkhonto we Sizwe, and again when a new series of military orders, decorations and medals was instituted in South Africa on 27 April 2003.

Description
Obverse
The Louw Wepener Medal is a bronze medallion, 38 millimetres in diameter, which depicts the mountain peak of Thaba Bosigo, with two men on horseback in the foreground. Below the horsemen are the words "THABA BOSIGO, 1865" and around the circumference are the words "LOUW WEPENER" at the top and "MEDALJE : MEDAL" at the bottom.

Reverse
The reverse has the pre-1994 South African Coat of Arms, with the decoration number impressed at the bottom on the rim.

Ribbon

Bar
 

When only ribbon bars are worn, a recipient of a subsequent award would have worn a bronze button with the encircled letters "LWD",  in diameter, on the ribbon bar.

Discontinuation
Conferment of the decoration was discontinued in respect of services performed on or after 1 July 1975, when a new set of decorations and medals was instituted.

Recipients

Actions cited for
e. Meyer, JJ -  Sergt Johannes Jogemus MEYER, Regiment Highveld, Awarded for rescuing a fellow soldier from drowning in the crocodile infested waters of the Kavango River, South West Africa (1 Military Area Rundu) on 22 April 1972.  Medal numbered 10.

References

Military decorations and medals of South Africa
Courage awards
1967 establishments in South Africa
Awards established in 1967